András Ballai (born 1964) is a retired Hungarian footballer.

Club career 
Ballai played with Zalaegerszegi TE in Nemzeti Bajnokság I in 1987/88, 1988/89 and 1991/92 and later in Slovenian First League with NK Nafta Lendava in 1992/93.

References 

1964 births
Living people
Hungarian footballers
Hungarian expatriate footballers
Zalaegerszegi TE players
Nemzeti Bajnokság I players
NK Nafta Lendava players
Expatriate footballers in Slovenia
Hungarian expatriate sportspeople in Slovenia
Association football midfielders